is a railway station in the city of Nasukarasuyama, Tochigi, Japan, operated by the East Japan Railway Company (JR East).

Lines

History
The station opened on 15 August 1934.

See also
 List of railway stations in Japan

References

External links
 JR East Station information 
 

Karasuyama Line
Nasukarasuyama
railway stations in Japan opened in 1934
railway stations in Tochigi Prefecture
stations of East Japan Railway Company